This is a list of songs written and/or produced by the Norwegian production team Stargate.

Produced singles

Album productions

External links

Production discographies
Discographies of Norwegian artists
Hip hop discographies